Leopoldia comosa (syn. Muscari comosum) is a perennial bulbous plant. Usually called the tassel hyacinth or tassel grape hyacinth, it is one of a number of species and genera also known as grape hyacinths. It is found in rocky ground and cultivated areas, such as cornfields and vineyards in the Mediterranean region, but has naturalized elsewhere. In southern Italy and Greece, its bulb is a culinary delicacy.

Description
Described by Oleg Polunin as "a striking plant", it has a tuft of bright blue to violet-blue sterile flowers above brownish-green fertile flowers, which open from dark blue buds, reminiscent of a menorah candelabrum. This tuft gives rise to the name "tassel hyacinth". The flower stem is 20–60 cm tall; individual flowers are borne on long stalks, purple in the case of the sterile upper flowers. Mature fertile flowers are 5–10 mm long with stalks of this length or more and are bell-shaped, opening at the mouth, where there are paler lobes. The linear leaves are 5–15 mm wide, with a central channel.

Leopoldia comosa naturalizes easily and may become invasive. It has spread northwards from its original distribution, for example appearing in the British Isles in the 16th century.

In a cultivar called 'Monstrosum' or 'Plumosum', all the flowers have become branched purple stems.

Cuisine
During Roman times, Pliny noted that the bulbs were eaten with vinegar, oil, and garum. Today, it is still eaten in some Mediterranean countries. In Greek it is called , βολβοί, βροβιοί volví, vrovií (ασκουρδαλάκοι in Crete). In Greece and especially on Crete, it is considered a delicacy and collected in the wild. The cleaned bulbs are boiled several times, pickled, and then kept in olive oil. The bulbs of the tassel hyacinth are mentioned in classical Hebrew literature under the name bulbūsīn.

Gallery

References

External links
 Wild Flowers of the British Isles: M comosum
 Paghat's Garden: M comosum
 Paghat's garden: M comosum 'Plumosum'

Scilloideae
Flora of Europe
Plants described in 1753
Taxa named by Carl Linnaeus
Root vegetables